Bongao Island is one of the islands of the Sulu Archipelago, a chain of islands between Mindanao and Borneo. Bongao Island is the town center of the municipality of Bongao, the capital of the province of Tawi-Tawi, the southernmost province of the Philippines. 

Being the urban area of Bongao, it is the trading center of the whole province. Commercial centers, banks, schools, hospitals and government buildings are located in the island. The main seaport of the Tawi-Tawi is also situated in the island. But the island also has natural attractions, which includes many beach resorts and the imposing mountain at the center of the island, Bud Bongao, which overlooks the landscape.

Barangays
10 out of Bongao's 35 barangays is situated in the island.

 Bongao Poblacion
 Lamion
 Nalil
 Pag-asa
 Pahut
 Pasiagan
 Simandagit
 Tubig-Boh
 Tubig-Mampallam
 Tubig Tanah

Geography
Directly north of the island is the island of Sanga-Sanga and its northeast is Pababag island. Both islands are still part of the municipality of Bongao.

Demographics
According to the latest 2020 census, Bongao Island's total number of residents is 75,076.

This table shows the population of the island's barangays.

Residents of the island practice Islam and are part of the ethnic group, Sama. But since the Bongao is the capital of commerce, it also has Christians and other groups such as Tausug, Yakan and Bisaya.

Transport

There are regular flights from Zamboanga and Cotabato through the airport located in the adjacent island of Sanga-Sanga.  There are also scheduled boat trips from Zamboanga and Jolo to Bongao.

References

See also

 List of islands by population density
 List of islands of the Philippines

Islands of Tawi-Tawi